Viacheslav Mykhailovych Semenov (18 August 1947 – 12 August 2022) was a Ukrainian footballer played as a midfielder or striker.

International career
Semenov made his debut for the USSR on 29 June 1972 in a friendly against Uruguay. He played in the 1974 FIFA World Cup qualifiers although the USSR did not qualify for the final tournament.

Honours
Dynamo Kyiv
 Soviet Top League: 1967, 1968

Zorya Voroshilovhrad
 Soviet Top League: 1972

USSR
 Olympic bronze: 1972

Notes

References

External links
 
 Profile 

1947 births
2022 deaths
Footballers from Kyiv
Soviet footballers
Ukrainian footballers
Association football forwards
Association football midfielders
Soviet Union international footballers
Soviet Top League players
FC Dynamo Kyiv players
FC Dnipro players
FC CSKA Kyiv players
FC Zorya Luhansk players
FC CSKA Kyiv managers
Olympic footballers of the Soviet Union
Footballers at the 1972 Summer Olympics
Olympic bronze medalists for the Soviet Union
Olympic medalists in football
Medalists at the 1972 Summer Olympics
Ukrainian football managers